Kizazi is an administrative ward within Muhambwe Constituency in Kibondo District of Kigoma Region in Tanzania. 
In 2016 the Tanzania National Bureau of Statistics report there were 19,520 people in the ward, from 17,734 in 2012.

Villages / neighborhoods 
The ward has 3 villages and 33 hamlets.

 Nyarugusu
 Bugwana
 Igambiliro
 Kangeze
 Kibhimba
 Kizazi
 Mutabo
 Ngulilo
 Rubali
 Rusange
 Samba
 Nyabitaka
 Azimio
 Ikaniko
 Kasana
 Kimanga
 Majengo
 Mshenyi
 Mtakuja
 Nchilakanyama
 Nyabulimbi
 Nyamayoka
 Kumshwabure
 Kafwandi
 Katovu
 Kibimba
 Kigarama
 Kumshwabure
 Kurusumu
 Nyamigaye
 Nyamikonko
 Nyarugunga
 Nyarunanga

References

Kibondo District
Wards of Kigoma Region
Constituencies of Tanzania